The Three-Day Reign (삼일천하 - Samil cheonha) also known as Three Days of Their Reign is a 1973 South Korean film directed by Shin Sang-ok. It was awarded Best Film at the Blue Dragon Film Awards ceremony. Actor Shin Young-kyun was also named Best Actor for his performance in the film.

Plot
During the last days of the Yi dynasty, conflict arises between the China-leaning conservatives, and the Western-learning and Japan-leaning reformers over how to rule Korea in the future. The reformer Kim Okgyun helps persuade the king to announce Korea's independence, breaking with China. When a conservative agent informs China, Chinese troops enter Korea and end the reign of independence after three days.

Cast
Shin Young-kyun
Shin Seong-il
Yoon Jeong-hee
Park Nou-sik
Nam Koong Won
Han Mun-jeong
Sin Il-ryong
Do Kum-bong
Hwang Hae
O Cheon-pyeong

Bibliography

Notes

Best Picture Blue Dragon Film Award winners
Films directed by Shin Sang-ok
1970s Korean-language films
South Korean historical drama films
1970s historical drama films